LocalBTV is an American streaming television service based in Los Altos, California and owned by Didja. The service allows subscribers to view live and DVR recorded streams of over-the-air television as well as national channels on Internet-connected devices.

Background
Similar in concept to the defunct services Locast and Aereo, LocalBTV offers local channels via streaming. However, LocalBTV has indicated they will only carry local channels that permit them to do so, thus avoiding the legal issues Aereo had, and more recently, Locast. LocalBTV's target customers are viewers who cannot receive local antenna reception, or their cable, satellite, or streaming service does not carry the local broadcast channel they would like to watch.

Services
As of December 2022, none of the major networks are carried, but the service is hoping to carry them at a later time. Some of the channels that LocalBTV currently carries are primary and subchannels such as Cozi TV, The Country Network, getTV and NewsNet as well as bilingual channels. Some of the national channels available everywhere in the US include Classic Reruns TV, Cozi TV, FNX and getTV. Also included with the app for the service is a program guide and cloud DVR service. Currently, the service is free with an optional paid version planned at a later date.

Availability
LocalBTV's selection of national channels are available in all markets in the United States. Currently, the selection of local channels on LocalBTV are available in 50 media markets in the United States.
Alexandria, Louisiana
Atlanta
Austin
Bakersfield
Biloxi
Boston
Charlotte
Chicago
Cincinnati
Cleveland
Columbus
Columbus-Opelika
Dallas
Detroit
Fresno
Hartford, Connecticut
Houston
Indianapolis
Jackson
Las Vegas
Los Angeles
Louisville
Miami
Milwaukee
Missoula
Monterey
Nashville
New York City
Norfolk
Orlando
Palm Beach
Pensacola
Philadelphia
Phoenix
Pittsburgh
Portland, Oregon
Raleigh
Reno
Sacramento
Salt Lake City
San Antonio
San Diego
San Francisco
Santa Barbara/San Luis Obispo
Seattle
St. Louis
Tampa
Toledo
Washington, D.C.
Wichita-Hutchinson

Supported devices
Currently, the service is supported on various platforms such as laptops, smartphones, as well as Amazon Fire TV, Apple TV, Android TV, and Roku streaming devices, including additional integration with Android TV's Live Channels app.

See also
 iCraveTV

References

External links
 

2017 establishments in California
American companies established in 2017
Internet properties established in 2017
Internet television streaming services